The Royal Order of Saint Prince Lazar is a chivalric order created by King Alexander I of Serbia to commemorate the five hundredth anniversary of the Battle of Kosovo that took place on the 28 June 1389. It must not be confused with the Order of Saint Lazarus. The order is named after Prince Lazar who commanded the Serbian armies in the battle. The Order is worn only by the King of Serbia / King of Yugoslavia and by his Crown Prince (when of majority).

History
The order of Saint Prince Lazar was instituted by the Decision of the Parliament, signed by the King Aleksandar I, to commemorate the fifth centenary of the Battle of Kosovo (28 June 1389), that ended in the collapse of the medieval Serbian state. Saint Prince Lazar, of the Hrebeljanović family, commanded the Serbian armies that were defeated by the Ottoman Sultan Murat I. The Sultan was assassinated by Serbian knight Miloš Obilić, while captured the Serbian Prince was beheaded by the victorious Turks. The cult of the Saint Prince was very strong among Serbs, and the event was reckoned to be the paramount one in the entire history of Serbs. The commemoration of the 500th Anniversary took form of the Anointment of the King, and the Collar of Saint Prince Lazar ordered to be made by Nicolaus und Dunker of Hannau (Germany). The Order is worn only by the King of Serbia and by his Crown Prince (when of majority). Since inception, the Order has been worn only by the following:

Rewarding
The Collar of the Order was allowed to be worn only by the ruler of Serbia (later Yugoslavia) and the heir to the throne:

Titular holder of the order

Sign and a chain of the Order

Sign and a chain of the Order were made of gold and richly decorated with rubies, sapphires, emeralds, diamonds and pearls. Order for production was the German firm Nicolaus und Dunker. Sketches awards carried a professor of archeology Michael Valtrović.

References

Saint Prince Lazar, Order of
Saint Prince Lazar, Order of
Awards established in 1889
Awards disestablished in 1945
1889 establishments in Serbia